Scyllarides squammosus is a species of slipper lobster known as the 'blunt slipper lobster. It is found throughout the Indo-West Pacific region. Specifically its range is from Australia (Queensland, New South Wales, West Australia), Japan, Hawaii, Melanesia, New Caledonia to East Africa. Scyllarides squammosus has been found at depths from 7.5 m to 71 m.

References

Further reading
Johnson, Martin W. (1977). "The final phyllosoma larval stage of the slipper lobster Scyllarides squamosus (H. Milne-Edwards) from the Hawaiian Islands (Decapoda, Scyllaridae)". Bulletin of Marine Science, vol. 27, no. 2.338-340. 
 DeMartini EE, Kleiber P. (1998). "Estimated body size at sexual maturity of slipper lobster Scyllarides squamosus at Maro Reef and Necker Island (Northwestern Hawaiian Islands)", 1986-97. Southwest Fisheries Science Center Administrative Report H-98-02, 14p.
 DeMartini EE, Williams HA. (2001). "Fecundity and egg size of Scyllarides squammosus (Decapoda: Scyllaridae) at Maro Reef, Northwestern Hawaiian Islands."  Journal of Crustacean Biology 21: 891-896. 
 DeMartini EE, Kleiber P, DiNardo GT. (2002). "Comprehensive (1986-2001) characterization of size at sexual maturity for Hawaiian spiny lobster (Panulirus marginatus) and slipper lobster (Scyllardides squammosus) in the Northwestern Hawaiian Islands." U.S. Dept. of Commerce, NOAA Technical Memorandum NOAA-TM-NMFS-SWFSC-344, 12 p.
 DeMartini EE, McCracken ML, Moffitt RB, Wetherall JA. (2005). "Relative pleopod length as an indicator of size at sexual maturity in slipper (Scyllarides squammosus) and spiny Hawaiian (Panulirus marginatus) lobsters." Fishery Bulletin 103(1): 23-33.

External links
 

Achelata
Crustaceans described in 1837
Taxa named by Henri Milne-Edwards